Burton M. Field is a retired United States Air Force lieutenant general. Prior to retirement he served as the deputy chief of staff for operations, plans and requirements, Headquarters United States Air Force.

Military career
Field was commissioned in 1979 after graduating from the United States Air Force Academy with a Bachelor of Science. He has commanded the 421st Fighter Squadron at Hill Air Force Base, Utah; the USAF Weapons School at Nellis AFB; the 8th Fighter Wing at Kunsan Air Base, South Korea; and the 1st Fighter Wing at Langley AFB. He also deployed as Commander, 332d Air Expeditionary Wing, Balad AB, Iraq. Field served on two major command staffs as well as the Joint Staff. He was also the Senior Military Adviser to the United States Special Representative for Afghanistan/Pakistan, the Pentagon, Washington, D.C.

Field is a command pilot with more than 3,400 flying hours in the F-16 and F-22. He completed the USAF Fighter Weapons Instructor Course in 1985, a Master of Business Administration from Golden Gate University in 1986, the 1993 Command and General Staff College in 1993, and graduated from the Air War College in 1998.

Assignments
 July 1979 – July 1980, student, undergraduate pilot training, Williams AFB, Arizona
 October 1980 – May 1981, student, F-16 Replacement Training Unit, Hill AFB, Utah
 May 1981 – December 1983, F-16 squadron pilot and instructor pilot, 430th Tactical Fighter Squadron, Nellis AFB, Nevada
 January 1984 – December 1984, F-16 instructor pilot, 80 TFS, Kunsan AB, South Korea
 January 1985 – May 1985, student, USAF Fighter Weapons Instructor Course, Nellis AFB, Nev
 May 1985 – May 1987, weapons and tactics officer and F-16 instructor pilot, 430th Tactical Fighter Squadron, Nellis AFB, Nevada
 May 1987 – July 1990, F-16 instructor pilot, academic instructor and flight commander, USAF Fighter Weapons School, Nellis AFB, Nevada
 August 1990 – June 1992, advanced medium-range air-to-air missile and F-22 action officer, Tactical Air Command, Langley AFB, Virginia
 June 1992 – June 1993, student, Army Command and General Staff College, Fort Leavenworth, Kansas
 July 1993 – June 1994, chief of standardization and evaluation, 388th Fighter Wing Hill AFB, Utah
 June 1994 – June 1995, operations officer, 34th Fighter Squadron, Hill AFB, Utah
 June 1995 – July 1997, commander of 421st Fighter Squadron, Hill AFB, Utah
 August 1997 – June 1998, student, Air War College, Maxwell AFB, Alabama
 July 1998 – May 2000, executive officer to commander of U.S. Air Forces in Europe, Ramstein AB, Germany
 May 2000 – April 2001, commandant, USAF Weapons School, Nellis AFB, Nevada
 May 2001 – May 2002, commander of 8th Fighter Wing, Kunsan AB, South Korea
 June 2002 – May 2003, assistant deputy director, Political-Military Affairs for Europe (J-5), the Joint Staff, Washington D.C.
 June 2003 – June 2005, deputy director, Politico-Military Affairs for Western Hemisphere (J-5), the Joint Staff, Washington, D.C.
 June 2005 – May 2007, commander of 1st Fighter Wing, Langley AFB, Virginia
 July 2007 – July 2008, commander, 332d Air Expeditionary Wing, Balad Air Base, Iraq
 July 2008 – February 2009, vice director for strategic plans and policy, Joint Staff, the Pentagon, Washington, D.C.
 February 2009 – October 2010, senior military adviser to the U.S. Special Representative for Afghanistan/Pakistan, the Pentagon, Washington, D.C.
 October 2010 – July 2012, commander of U.S. Forces Japan, and Commander, 5th Air Force, Pacific Air Forces, Yokota Air Base, Japan
 July 2012 – present, Deputy Chief of Staff for Operations, Plans and Requirements, Headquarters U.S. Air Force, Washington, D.C.

Awards and decorations

References
Lieutenant General Burton M. Field at U.S. Air Force

External links

1957 births
Living people
United States Air Force Academy alumni
United States Air Force generals
Recipients of the Legion of Merit
United States Air Force personnel of the Iraq War
Recipients of the Air Medal
United States Army Command and General Staff College alumni
Recipients of the Defense Superior Service Medal
Air War College alumni
Golden Gate University alumni